Flower urchins may refer to:
Toxopneustes pileolus, a venomous species of sea urchin from the tropical Indo-West Pacific
Members of the genus Toxopneustes in general

Animal common name disambiguation pages